SV Urk is a football club from Urk, Netherlands. Urk plays in the Saturday Hoofdklasse.

History
The club became champions in the Hoofdklasse in 1996 and in 2000. At that time the Hoofdklasse was the highest amateur league in the Netherlands. Urk won the Districtsbeker in the East district in 1985. SV Urk is also known as a club that produces a lot of young talent.

References

External links
 Official site

1940 establishments in the Netherlands
Association football clubs established in 1940
SV Urk
SV Urk